The Presidential Elections Committee was set up by the Government of Singapore to ensure that each candidate running for the office of President of Singapore has the qualifications needed — referred in Article 19 of the Constitution of Singapore.

Composition
The committee consists of:
 the Chairman of the Public Service Commission, who is also the Chairperson of the Presidential Elections Committee
 the Chairman of the Accounting and Corporate Regulatory Authority 
 a member of the Presidential Council for Minority Rights, appointed by the Chairperson of that Council
 a member or former member of the Council of Presidential Advisers (but not the sitting Chairperson of that Council or a former member who vacated his seat under Article 37F(2)(a) or (c) of the Constitution), appointed by the Chairperson of that Council
 a person who is qualified to be or has been a Judge of the Supreme Court, appointed by the Chief Justice
 a person, who in the opinion of the Prime Minister has expertise and experience acquired in the private sector that is relevant to the functions of the Committee, appointed by the Prime Minister

Criticism

Amount of discretionary power 
Legal academic Valentine Winslow wrote that the committee has the power to reject anyone who does not have "integrity, good character, and reputation", and that this places too much discretionary power in the hands of a small group of persons, with no guarantee that they are qualified to judge others as being of integrity and good character, or are unbiased, as there is no provision for any independent election commission.

Constitutional lawyer Thio Li-ann wrote that the mechanism of selecting qualified candidates "removes the power of choice one step further away from the people, placing in the hands of an unelected group of people the power to decide who is a suitable candidate".

Decisions beyond judicial review 
Thio observed that the committee is "not under a legal duty to give reasons for their decision, which is deficient as a process".

Opacity of decisions leading to embarrassment 
Winslow suggested that there is an "embarrassment of uncertainty" for a candidate seeking nomination, because they may be rejected for reasons completely unclear to them, and that "men of eminence" will not agree to be nominated if they are likely to be humiliated by rejection.

Presidential election, 2017
The Presidential Elections Committee for the 2017 Singapore presidential election comprises six members. They are:
 Eddie Teo, Public Service Commission chairman
 Lim Soo Hoon, Accounting and Corporate Regulatory Authority chairperson
 Chan Heng Chee, member of the Presidential Council for Minority Rights
 Po'ad Shaik Abu Bakar Mattar, member of the Council of Presidential Advisers
 Tay Yong Kwang, a Judge of Appeal
 Peter Seah, chairman of DBS Bank

There is also a Community Committee, which will assess whether the candidate belongs to the specified racial group. This committee is headed by Timothy James de Souza, a member of the Presidential Council of Minority Rights.

Malay community sub-committee
The Malay community sub-committee, which will issue the Malay Community Certificate to candidates, comprises five members. They are:
 Imram Mohamed, former chairman of the Association of Muslim Professionals (chairperson)
 Fatimah Azimullah, advisor to the Singapore Muslim Women's Association
 Mohammad Alami Musa, president of Majlis Ugama Islam Singapura (Islamic Religious Council of Singapore) and an inter-religious relations scholar
 Yatiman Yusof, a former senior parliamentary secretary
 Zulkifli Baharudin, non-resident ambassador to Uzbekistan and Kazakhstan, and the executive chairman of Indo-Trans Corporation

All five were also on the Malay Community Committee that gave the green light to Malay candidates in Group Representation Constituencies in the 2015 General Election.

Former committees

Presidential election, 2005
The Presidential Elections Committee for the 2005 Singapore presidential election had three members:
 Andrew Chew Guan Khuan (Chairman)
 Lim Siong Guan
 H R Hochstadt

References

Elections in Singapore
Presidential elections in Singapore
Presidents of Singapore